The 1918–19 Swiss International Ice Hockey Championship was the fourth edition of the international ice hockey championship in Switzerland. Six teams participated in the championship, which was won by HC Rosey Gstaad, who defeated HC Bellerive Vevey in the final.

First round

Group 1

Group 2

Final 
 HC Rosey Gstaad - HC Bellerive Vevey 2:0

External links 
Swiss Ice Hockey Federation – All-time results

International
Swiss International Ice Hockey Championship seasons